Silhouettes and Statues: A Gothic Revolution 1978-1986 is a compilation album by various artists which features songs between 1978-1986 that influenced the Gothic rock genre. Includes liner notes by journalist and author Natasha Scharf.

Track listing

References

2017 albums
Cherry Red Records compilation albums